Nanchang County is a county of Jiangxi Province, China. It is under the administration of the prefecture-level city of Nanchang, the provincial capital.

Administration
Nanchang County has 11 towns and 7 townships.

Towns

Townships

References

External links 
 Home page of the local region

Nanchang